The Albert Smith House in or near Waldwick, Bergen County, New Jersey, United States, was built in 1750.  It was listed on the National Register of Historic Places in 1983.  The property is listed in the National Register's database as being located in both Bergen County, New Jersey and Allegany County, New York, which must be an error as Allegany County is far away, bordering Pennsylvania not New Jersey.

See also
National Register of Historic Places listings in Bergen County, New Jersey

References

Houses on the National Register of Historic Places in New Jersey
Houses completed in 1750
Houses in Bergen County, New Jersey
National Register of Historic Places in Bergen County, New Jersey
New Jersey Register of Historic Places
Waldwick, New Jersey